Chika Joy Amalaha (born 28 October 1997) is a Nigerian weightlifter. In 2019 she tested positive for metenolone and is banned until 2027 by the International Weightlifting Federation.

2014 Commonwealth Games
Amalaha won the gold medal in the women's 53 kg weight class at the 2014 Commonwealth Games at Glasgow, and set a new Games records in 53 kg weight category in both the snatch and overall elements.

She later failed a drug test, and was temporarily banned from continuing the Games on 29 July 2014 after Amiloride and Hydrochlorothiazide were found in her A sample. Her B sample was then sent for testing the following day, which returned positive to prohibited substances. Following the Commonwealth Games Federation (CGF) scheduled meeting with Amalaha on 1 August 2014, she was subsequently stripped of her medal   As a result, Dika Toua of Papua New Guinea was awarded gold, Santoshi Matsa of India silver and Swati Singh, also of India, bronze.

Amalaha was subsequently handed a two-year doping ban. The ban ended 25 July 2016.

References

External links
 
 

1997 births
Living people
Nigerian female weightlifters
Nigerian sportspeople in doping cases
Doping cases in weightlifting
Commonwealth Games competitors for Nigeria
Weightlifters at the 2014 Commonwealth Games
African Games medalists in weightlifting
African Games gold medalists for Nigeria
African Games silver medalists for Nigeria
Competitors at the 2019 African Games
Sportswomen from Rivers State
Place of birth missing (living people)
20th-century Nigerian women
21st-century Nigerian women